Ray or Raymond Elliot may refer to:

Ray Elliot of Them (band)
Ray Elliot, character in The Alibi
Raymond Elliot, coach

See also
Ray Eliot
Raymond Elliott (disambiguation)